C-Note is a live album by Prince and The New Power Generation released in 2004 (though all five tracks had been released as separate mp3 files earlier in 2003). Its genre is jazz, with five tracks taken from soundchecks during the One Nite Alone... Tour.

Four of the five tracks are named after the location they were recorded in. The album's title is an acronym, taken from the first letters of the five tracks: "Copenhagen", "Nagoya", "Osaka", "Tokyo", and "Empty Room".

The entire album was recorded live from the audio console by Prince's concert sound engineer Scottie Baldwin.

The first four tracks are instrumentals, although the fourth features Prince repeating "Tokyo". The fifth track is a live rendition of "Empty Room" (recorded October 25, 2002 in Copenhagen), though the song was written ca. August 4, 1985, when it was first recorded. The song is reported to have been written and recorded for Susannah Melvoin after relationship difficulty.

The album is highly experimental and reminiscent of the Madhouse project. It was sold in digital format only on Prince's NPG Music Club. C-Note is jazz-oriented along with quiet storm, jazz-fusion, jazz-funk, and smooth jazz. It is also atmospheric and new age-themed.

History
Prince's then-fan club, The NPG Music Club charged $100 for a membership that had advertised that paying members would receive four exclusive albums. After Prince released One Nite Alone... and the three-disc One Nite Alone... Live!, members who felt deceived sent complaints of Federal Mail Fraud to the Minnesota Attorney General's office and the Better Business Bureau after Prince failed to honor the agreement. Some fans speculated that the albums Xpectation and C-Note (slang for a $100 bill) were his response to being forced to comply to these demands.

The album is now available on iTunes.

Track listing
Original 2003 downloads (as separate tracks)
 "Copenhagen" –  13:28
 contains a portion of Miles Davis' "Jean-Pierre"
 "Nagoya" – 8:54
 "Osaka" – 5:28
 "Tokyo" – 5:04
 "Empty Room" – 4:02

2004 re-release/2015 TIDAL
 "Copenhagen" – 10:07
 excises Davis interpolation

Personnel
 Prince – various instruments, vocals on "Empty Room"
 John Blackwell – drums
 Greg Boyer – trombone
 Candy Dulfer – saxophone
 Eric Leeds - tenor saxophone and keyboards
 Renato Neto – keyboards
 Maceo Parker – alto saxophone
 Rhonda Smith – Bass guitar
 Dudley D. – Scratching
Scottie Baldwin - FOH Recording and Mix Engineer

References

2004 live albums
Prince (musician) albums
Albums produced by Prince (musician)
NPG Records live albums